CKRQ-FM is a First Nations community radio station that operates at 96.5 FM in Whapmagoostui, Quebec, Canada.

Owned by Whapmagoostui Aeyouch Telecommunications, the station received CRTC approval in 1994.

References

External links

Krq
Krq
Radio stations established in 1994
1994 establishments in Quebec